Mu'izz ad-Din Muhammad ibn Sam, also Mu'izz ad-Din Muhammad Ghori, also Ghūri (1144 – March 15, 1206), commonly known as Muhammad of Ghor, also Ghūr, or Muhammad Ghori, also Ghūri, was a ruler from the Ghurid dynasty based in the present-day Afghanistan who ruled from 1173 to 1206. During the diarchy of Muhammad and his elder sibling Ghiyasuddin Ghori, the Ghurids reached the pinnacle of their territorial expansion. Muhammad of Ghor extended the Ghurid dominions eastwards and laid the foundation of Muslim rule in the Indian Subcontinent, which lasted after him for nearly half a millennium under the evolving Muslim dynasties.

During his early military career as a prince and governor of the southern tract of the Ghurid Empire, Muhammad subjugated the Oghuz tribe after multiple raids and captured Ghazna where he was crowned by Ghiyasuddin Ghori, who was ruling from his capital Firozkoh since 1163. Muhammad crossed the Indus River in 1175, approaching it through Gomal Pass and captured Multan and Uch from the Qarmatīa rulers within a year. Afterwards, Muhammad entered into mainland India in 1178 by the way of lower Sindh, only to end up getting routed at Kasahrada, near Mount Abu by a coalition of Rajput chiefs led by Mularaja II, which forced him to change his route for future inroads into India. Hence, Muhammad pressed upon the Ghaznawids, and uprooted them by 1186, conquering the upper Indus Plain along with most of the Punjab. After consolidating in the northwest, Muhammad of Ghor, penetrated into northern India through the Khyber Pass, the traditional route of entry for invading armies into northern India

In 1191, the Ghurid forces were routed and Muhammad himself got wounded in the engagement with the Rajput Confederacy led by Prithviraj Chauhan in Tarain, about 70 miles north of Delhi. However, in 1192, Muhammad returned with a vast army of Turkish mounted archers and secured a decisive victory in the return engagement on the same battleground and executed Prithviraj shortly afterwards. He limited his presence in India afterwards, deputing the political and military operations in the region to a handful of elite slave commanders  who swiftly raided local Indian kingdoms and extended the Ghurid influence as far east as the Ganges delta in Bengal and regions to the north in Bihar.

After the death of his brother in 1203, Muhammad of Ghor ascended the throne of Fīrōzkōh as well. Within a year or so in conflict with the Khwarazmian Empire, he suffered a disastrous defeat in the Battle of Andkhud against the Qara-Khitai forces (came in as aid of Khwarazmian Empire) led by Tayangu, as a result the Ghurid power quickly died out in most of the Khurasan. Muhammad suppressed the rebels which arose after the defeat and built a boat bridge across the Oxus to launch a full-scale invasion of Transoxiana to avenge his defeat, although a rebellion by the Khokhars forced him to move towards Punjab, where he brutually crushed the Khokhar revolt during his last campaign.

On his way back, Muhammad of Ghor was assassinated on the bank of Indus at Damyak on 15 March 1206, by a group of assassins from the rival Ismāʿīlīyah sect while offering the evening prayer. Muhammad of Ghor's assassination effectively ended the Ghurid sovereignty as his successors were vassaslized by their Turkish adversaries - Khwarazmians under Muhammad II who overthrew the Ghurids by 1215. His conquests in the Indian Subcontinent, although continued to thrive under the Mamlūk dynasty established by his slave commander Qutb ud-Din Aibak.

Early years

Name and title
Muhammad of Ghor was born in the Ghur region of present-day Afghanistan to the Ghurid ruler Baha al-Din Sam I who ruled ruled his ancestral realm briefly before he died in 1149, when Muhammad of Ghor was a child. His name is variously transliterated as Muizuddin Sam, Shihabuddin Ghuri, Muhammad Ghori and Muhammad of Ghor. According to the Tabaqat-i-Nasiri, his birth name was "Muhammad" which is vernacularly spelt as "Hamad" by the Ghurids. During his childhood, his mother used to call him "Zangi" due to his dark skin tone. After the coronation in Ghazna, he styled himself as "Malik Shihabuddin" and after his occupation of Khurasan, he took the title of "Muizzuddin" or "Mu'izz al-Din".

The synchronous accounts did not write much about Muhammad's exact birth date, although Minhaj al-Siraj states that Muhammad was four odd years younger to Ghiyath al-Din Muhammad who was born in 1140. Assuming Minhaj account to be correct, Muhammad's birth year can be dated to 1144-1145.

Early career
The early years of both Muhammad of Ghor and his brother Ghiyath al-Din were spent in constant hardship. Their uncle Ala al-Din Husayn after his campaign in Ghazna, initially installed them as governors of Sanjah. However, their efficient administration of the province, made him doubtful of their uprise and seeing a possible challenge to his own authority, he ordered his nephews to be imprisoned in the castle of Gharjistan. Although, they were released from the captivity by his son Sayf al-Din Muhammad after the death of his father in 1161. Sayf al-Din, later died in a battle against the nomadic Oghuzs of Balkh.

‌After their release from the captivity, "Tarik-i-Firishtah" states that the Ghurid brothers were reinstated in Sanjah, although earlier account of "Tabaqat-i-Nasiri" stated that the hardship continued due to their financial conditions. Muhammad thus, took shelter in the court of his uncle Fakhruddin Masud who held the principality of Bamiyan as vassal of Alauddin Husayn.

Later, Fakhr al-Din Masud laid his own claim for the succession after Sayf al-Din death as the elder member of the Ghurid family. Muhammad of Ghor helped his brother in suppressing the revolt of Fakhruddin who garnered a sizeable army in alliance with the chiefs of Balkh and Herat who both were executed in the battle, although Fakhruddin was reinstated in Bamiyan in 1163. Afterwards, with support of the remaining local Ghurid officers and "maliks", his brother succeeded Sayf al-Din to the throne in 1163 and initially placed Muhammad as a minor officer in his court, which result in him retiring (unhappy with his position) to the court of Sistan where he spend a whole season. However, later Ghiyath-al din sent an envoy to brought him back who subsequently placed him in charge of the southern part of the Ghurid domains which possibly included Istiyan and Kajuran. 
‌
During the early campaigns of Muhammad of Ghor as a prince, he was instructed to subdue the Oghuz tribes whose power and influence began to wane, although they were still controlling extensive territories. He used Qandhar as a base and raided the principality of Oghuzs multiple times, before defeating them decisively along with Ghiyath al-Din and followed up their victory by conquering Ghazna in 1169 along with some other territories in what is present-day eastern Afghanistan. Soon, his coronation took place in Ghazna in 1173 and his brother returned to Firuzkuh for the westwards expansion in Transoxania. In 1174, he led an expedition against the Ghuzzs of Sanquran in present-day Turkmenistan and subdued them.
 
In 1175, Muhammad of Ghor marched from Ghazna and helped his brother in the annexation of Herat and Pushang after defeating a former general of Seljuk ruler Ahmed Sanjar. The Ghurid brothers advanced into the present-day Iran and brought Nasrid dynasty of Sistan under their sway whose ruler Taj al-Din III Harb ibn Muhammad ibn Nasr acknowledged the Ghurid suzerainty and later sent his armies many times assisting the Ghurids in their warfares. Afterwards, Ghiyath al-Din captured Balkh and territories adjoining Herat in Khurasan. Meanwhile, Muhammad of Ghor, turned himself towards the Indian Subcontinent and began to invade the territories in the present-day Pakistan from 1175.

Invasion of India

Early invasions

Muhammad of Ghor's expeditions in the Indian subcontinent started against the Qarmatians (sevener branch of Isma'ilis) who regained their hold on Multan, soon after the death of Mahmud of Ghazna who installed a Sunni governor there. Muhammad defeated the Qarmatian ruler Khafif in 1175 and annxed Multan. The defeat turned to be a death blow for the Qarmatian power in Multan, who never regained their influence in the region again.

After the conquest of Multan, Muhammad of Ghor captured Uch which was situated south of the confluence of the rivers Chenab and Jhelum. While his campaign in Uch is not mentioned in detail in the near contemporary accounts except Kāmil fit-Tārīkh, although the detail in the text about his expedition in Uch is possibly blurred by a legend associated with the Bhati Rajputs. Nonetheless, Firishta, a later chronicler mentioned the year of Uch conquest as 1176. It was placed under Malik Nasiurdin Aitam until his defeat in Battle of Andkhud in 1204. Afterwards, it was placed under Qabacha.

During the course of his early invasions, Muhammad avoided Punjab and instead focused on lands bordering the middle and lower course of the Indus. Therefore, to outflank the Ghaznawids in Punjab and to open up an alternative route to the Northern India, Muhammad turned south towards present-day Gujarat in Anhilwara. Before entering in Anhilwara, he laid siege to the fort of Nadol (around Marwar) and captured it after a short siege from Kelhanadeva along with sacking the Shiva temple in Kiradu. After marching through the dry Thar Desert south of Marwar, the Ghurid army got exhausted, when they reached Mount Abu where they were routed in the mountainous pass of Gadararaghatta, by the Solanki ruler Mularaja II who was also aided by other Rajput chiefs mainly the Naddula Chahamana ruler Kelhanadeva (who was earlier deposed by from Nadol by Muhammad), the Jalor Chahamana ruler Kirtipala, and the Arbuda Paramara ruler Dharavarsha. The Ghurid army suffered heavy casualties during the battle, and also in the retreat back across the desert to Ghazni. The defeat forced Muhammad to opt for the northern routes who thenceforth, concentrated on creating a suitable base in Punjab and northwest for further incursions into northern India.

Conquest of Punjab

In 1179, Muhammad of Ghor conquered Peshawar which was possibly ruled by the Ghaznavids. Thereafter, he advanced further and besieged Lahore in 1181, although Khusrau Malik managed to kept him around the borders of Lahore for few more years by sending tributes along with one of the Ghaznavid prince (Malik Shah) under his custody in Ghazna as a hostage. In 1182, Muhammad subjugated the Soomra rulers of Sindh, capturing enitre region till the seashore in Debal. In the subsequent years, he expanded and consolidated his conquests around present-day Pakistan and annexed Sialkot along with sacking Lahore and the countryside. After Khusrau Malik made an unsuccessful attempt to dislodge the Ghurid garrison in Sialkot, Muhammad of Ghor made the final assault on Lahore and forced him to surrender after a short siege. He later treacherously imprisoned Khusrau Malik in the fort of Gharchistan, breaching his own agreement of safe conduct for his presence. Khusrau Malik and all his kinfolks were executed before 1192. Thus, ended the lineage of Ghaznavids and their historic struggle with the Ghurids.

After uprooting the Ghaznavids, Muhammad of Ghor now established his sway over the upper Indus Plain, including most of the Punjab. He, appointed Mulla Sirajuddin who was earlier a high-ranking Qāḍi in his father court, as the head of judicature department in the newly conquered Ghaznavid territories along with the charge of Multan. His son Minhaj al-Siraj (born 1193) later composed the Tabaqat-i-Nasiri in 1260 which is regarded as a monumental work from the medieval period on the Ghurid dynasty and the Delhi Sultanate.

First Battle of Tarain 

In 1190, after consildating in Sindh and western Punjab, the Ghurid generals began to raid the eastern Punjab region and captured a fortress, Bathinda in present-day Punjab state on the northwestern frontier of Prithviraj Chauhan's kingdom. After appointing a Qazi Zia-ud-Din of Tulak as governor of the fortress with 1200 horsemen, Muhammad received the news that Prithviraj's army, led by his vassal prince Govind Rai were on their way to besiege the fortress. The two armies eventually met near the town of Tarain, 14 miles from Thanesar in present-day Haryana. The battle was marked by the initial attack of mounted Mamluk archers to which Prithviraj responded by counter-attacking from three sides and thus dominating the battle. Muhammad mortally wounded Govind Rai in personal combat and in the process was himself wounded, whereupon his army retreated and Prithvīrāj's army was deemed victorious.

According to Minhaj, Muhammad was carried away from the battleground in wounded state by a Khalji horsemen. A largely different account from Za'inul Masir claimed that Muhammad after being wounded in combat with Govindraja fell unconscious and his forces  withdrew in disarray after assuming him to be dead, later a remnant of his soldiers arrived in the night and searched for his body at the battlesite. Muhammad in extremely critical situation recognised his soldiers, who rejoiced after finding him alive and took him from the battlefield in a litter to Ghazna. However, the version from Za'inul Masir is not corroborated by any other contemporary and later writers, which made its authenticity dubious and the version of Minhaj more credible.

The Ghurid garrison of Tabarhind under Ziauddin, held out for thirteen months before being capitulated. The Rajputs could not make quick progressions during the siege due to absence of siege engines on their part, which strengthened the position of Muhammad of Ghor during these months to raise a formidable army.

Second Battle of Tarain 

After the defeat in Tarain, Muhammad of Ghor meted out severe punishments to the Ghurid, Khalji and Afghan "emirs" who fled during the battle. The wallets filled with grains were tied around their necks and under this condition they were paraded through Ghazna, those who refused were beheaded. The late medieval historian Ferishta, further states on the testinomy of folklore in Ghazna, that Muhammad vowed not to visit his royal harem and heal his wounds sustained in the battle, till he avenge the humiliation of his defeat. Husain Kharmil, a prominent Iranian general of the Ghurids was called from Ghazna with a large contingent along with other seasoned warloards like Mukalba, Kharbak and Illah. The near contemporary writers Minhaj-i-Siraj and Abdul Malik Isami stated that Muhammad brought 120,000-130,000 fully armoured men to the battle in 1192. While,  Firishta placed the strength of Rajput army in the decisive battle at 3,000 elephants, 300,000 cavalry and infantry (most likely a gross exaggeration).

Prithviraj Chauhan had called his banners but hoped to buy time as his banners (other Rajputs under him or his allies) had not arrived. Before the next day, the Ghurids attacked the Rajput army before dawn. Although they were able to quickly form formations, they suffered losses due to surprise attacks before sunrise. The Rajput army was eventually defeated and Prithviraj was taken prisoner and subsequently executed. After the victory, the Ghurids sacked Ajmer and brought much of the Chahamana territory of Siwalik under their sway. Muhammad of Ghor captured and placed strong garrisons at the strategic military stations of Sirsa, Hansi, Samana and Kohram. He later installed Prithviraja's minor son Govindaraja IV as his puppet ruler on condition of heavy tribute.

However, later after a revolt by his uncle Hariraja, Govindraja was forced to move towards Ranthambore, where he established a new dynasty of the Chahamanas. Hariraja, briefly dislodged the Ghurid garrison from Ajmer, but was later defeated by Qutb ud-Din Aibak. Subsequently, Hairaja immolated himself on a funeral pyre and the Ghurids reoccupied Ajmer and placed it under a Muslim governor. Soon after, Delhi was also captured by Muhammad of Ghor and Qutb al-Din Aibak in 1192, although in continuation with the policy adopted earlier in Ajmer, a puppet Rajput scion was installed in Delhi on tribute. (possibly the son of Govindraja who died in Tarain) However, he was soon deposed on the account of treason.

While, Muhammad of Ghor continued to carry raids in the north Indian plain, although later he got preoccupied with the Ghurid expansion in Transoxiana against the Khwarezmian Empire as his brother Ghiyath al-Din began to have health problems. Notwithstanding, Muhammad as per the writings of Fakhr-i Mudabbir and Minhaj-i Siraj Juzjani, appointed Aibak as his administraitor of the Ghurid domains in North India after the Second Battle of Tarain. His slave generals (Aibak, Bakhtiyar Khalji and Yildiz) before his assassination, swiftly raided the local kingdoms and expanded his empire in the Indian Subcontinent up to north-western parts of Bengal in east, Ajmer and Ranthambore (Rajasthan) in north and till the borders of Ujjain in south.

Further campaigns 

After Aibak consildated the Ghurid rule in and around the Delhi doab, Muhammad of Ghor himself returned to India to further expand in the Ganga Valley. Accordingly in 1194, he crossed the Jamuna river with an army of 50,000 horsemen and defeated the forces of Gahadavala king Jayachandra in a battle near Jumna, where Jayachandra was killed in action. After a general massacre of the populace, the Ghurids desecrated the Hindu pilgrim centre of Benaras and captured the castle of Asni, where the royal treasure of the Gahadavalas was plundered. The Gahadavala capital Kanauj was annexed in 1198. During this campaign, the Buddhist city of Sarnath was also sacked.

Conquest of Bayana
Muhammad of Ghor returned to the Indian frontier again around 1196 to consolidate his hold around the present-day Rajasthan. The territory of Bayana at the time was under the control of a sect of Jadaun Rajputs. Muhammad along with Aibak advanced and besieged Thankar whose ruler Kumarpal was defeated. Muhammad placed the fort under his senior slave Baha-ur din Tughril, who later established Sultankot and used it as his stronghold. After the conquest of Thankar, Bahaurddin Turghil reduced the fort of Gwalior whose Parihar chief Sallakhanapala surrendered after a long siege and  accepted the Ghurid suzerainty. After the assassination of Muhammad of Ghor, Tourghil styled himself as the Sultan in Bayana.

In 1197, Qutb ud-Din Aibak invaded Gujarat and defeated Bhima II in Sirohi after a sudden attack and afterwards sacked his capital Anhilwara. Thus, Aibak avenged the rout of Muhammad of Ghor at the same place in 1178.

Struggle in Central Asia
Muhammad of Ghor continued to aid his brother for the expansion in west against the Khwarezmians in the interlude of his eastwards expansion. Meanwhile in the affairs of Chorasmia, Sultan Shah was defeated by his brother Ala al-Din Tekish in alliance with the Qara Khitai troops and the later succeeded the throne of Khwarezm in December 1172. Sultan Shah fled to the Ghurid brothers and asked for their assistance in order to expel his brother Tekish. While they received him well, they refused to give him military aid against Tekish, with whom the Ghurids were on good terms till then. Sultan Shah, carved out his independent principality in Khurasan and began plundering the regions of Ghor along with his governor Bahauddin Turghil. Thus, Ghhiyath al-Din asked for aid from Muhammad of Ghor, who was occupied with his Indian expeditions at the time, marched with his army from Ghazna. The Ghurid feudatories: Shamsuddin Muhammad of Bamiyan and Tajuddin of Herat joined them with their respective contingents against the Khwarezmians.

The Ghurid forces decisively defeated Sultan Shah on the banks of river Murgabh after months of campaigning and executed their governor of Herat Bahauddin Turghil while Sultan Shah fled to Merv. The Ghurids followed their victory by recapturing Herat. Sultan Shah died after a year in 1191 possibly due to the drug overdose. According to historian A.B.M. Habibullah, the Ghurids could not annex any territory in Khurasan outside Herat which remained under the sway of Tekesh and who by 1193 captured much of the Persia along with the Trans-Caspian belt. Conversely, C. E. Bosworth stated that Ghurids annexed some part of Khurasan after their victory in Merv.

Later

Tekish died in 1200, which led to a brief period of struggle for the succession between Alauddin Shah of Khwarezm and his nephew Hindu Khan. The Ghurid brothers seized the opportunity and amidst the turmoil in the Khwarezmian house, invaded and captured Nishapur, Merv, Sarakhas and Tus and reached till Gorgan. The Ghurids, thus, for a short span established their sway over most of the Khurasan for first time in their history. Although, their success turned to be a short-term affair as Alauddin succeeded the throne in August 1200 and soon after recaptured his lost domains by 1201. Despite the success against the Ghurids, Alauddin sent an envoy for diplomacy to Muhammad of Ghor, probably to focus solely on overcoming from the suzerainty of Qara Khitais by sougthing peace with the Ghurids. However, the attempt turned to be futile and Muhammad marched again with his forces on Nishapur which forced Alauddin to shut himself inside the city walls. Muhammad Ghori recaptured Tus along with Herat and sacked the coutryside.

Ghiyath al-Din Ghuri around this time died at Herat on 13 March 1203, after months of illness which briefly diverted Muhammad of Ghor's attention from the existing state of affairs. Thus, taking  advantage of his absence from Herat where he appointed his nephew Alp Ghazi, Khwarezmian forces captured Merv and beheaded the Ghurid governor Karang there. Muhammad of Ghor, possibly to swept away the Khwarezmian Empire, laid siege to their capital Gurganj, instead of Herat which was besieged by the Khwarezmians after Ghiyath al-Din's death. Alauddin retreated on the Ghurid advance and desperately requested aid from the Qara Khitais, who sent a sizeable army to aid the Khwarezmians. Muhammad, because of the pressure from the Qara Khitai forces was forced to relieve the siege and retreat. However, he was chased on his way to Firuzkuh and was decisively defeated in the Battle of Andkhud in 1204 by the combined forces of Qara Khitai and Kara-Khanid Khanate under Taniku and Uthman ibn Ibrahim. He was allowed to return to his capital, after paying a heavy ransom to the Qara Khitai general Taniku (Tayangu) which included several elephants and gold coins. According to Minhaj al-Siraj, the negotiations between Muhammad of Ghor and Taniku were arranged by Uthman ibn Ibrahim of Samarkand who do not want the "Sultan of Islam" to be captured by the infidels. Following the defeat, the Ghurids lost the control over most of the Khurasan except Herat and Balkh. Thus, Muhammad of Ghor of necessity agreed for a cold peace with the Khwarezmians.

Final days
After the disaster of Andkhud and the subsequent rumours of  Muhammad of Ghor's death in the battle led to widespread mutiny throughout the Ghurid empire, most notably by Aybek Beg, Husain Kharmil and by the governor of Ghazna Yildiz as well. (not Taj al-Din Yildiz who was in charge of Kirman then) Muhammad of Ghor first marched to Multan instead of Ghazna, where his slave general Aybek Beg (who rescued him in Battle of Andkhud) assassinated the Ghurid governor Amir Dad Hasan in a personal meeting and issued a fake decree of him being appointed by Muhammad as the new governor of Multan. Muhammad of Ghor defeated Aybek decisively and captured him in the battle. Afterwards, he marched towards Ghazna, where Yildiz mutinied earlier and seized the city. On the advance of a vast army of Muhammad of Ghor, foreseeing an inevitable defeat, Yildiz and his aristocrats surrendered to Muhammad, who pardoned them.

Thus, Muhammad of Ghor successfully restored his empire to stability, after suppressing the mutineers and turned his attention towards the affairs of Central Asia again to avenge the rout at Andhkhud and to reclaim Khurasan. He ordered Baha al-Din Sam II to construct boat bridge across the river Oxus to facilitate the march of his armies in Transoxiana. However, soon another political unrest occurred which turned him towards Punjab again where he was eventually assassinated.

Campaign against Khokhars
The Khokhar tribe whose influence extended from the lower Indus until Siwalik hills, arose in the wake of Muhammad of Ghor's rout near Amu Darya and rebelled by disrupting the Ghurid communication chain between Lahore and Ghazni along with plundering Lahore. According to Minhaj al-Siraj, the Khokhars were hostile to Muslims and use to "torment every "Musalman they captured".

Muhammad of Ghor, thus, marched from Firuzkuh in December 1205 for his last campaign to subjugate the Khokhars. The Khokhars led by Bakan and Sarkha offered a battle somewhere between the Chenab and Jhelum rivers and fought valiantly  until the afternoon but Muhammad carried the day after Illtutmish arrived with a reserve contingent, whom Muhammad earlier stationed on the banks of Jhelum. Muhammad of Ghor followed his victory by a large scale slaughter of the Khokhars. His armies also burnt down the forests where many of them took refuge while fleeing.

Iltutmish was rewarded for his gallantry against the Khokhars with a presentation of special robe of honour from Muhammad of Ghor. According to Minhaj, he also manumitted Illtutmish, despite the fact that his master Aibak who purchased him originally was still a slave along with other senior slaves of Muhammad who were not manumitted until that point.

Assassination

After crushing the Khokhars, on his way back to his capital in Ghazna, Muhammad of Ghor's caravan rested at Dhamiak near Sohawa (which is near the city of Jhelum in the Punjab province of modern-day Pakistan) where he was assassinated on March 15, 1206, by the Ismāʿīlī emissaries.

According to some sketchy accounts regarding the identity of Muhammad's assassins, claimed that the assassins were sent by Alauddin Shah of Khwarezm. However, the Khwarezmians already curbed the Ghurid ambition in Transoxiana after the Andkhud debacle and were not facing any potential danger from them. Hence, historian Mohammad Habib theorizes that this speculation  that the Ismaili assassins were sent by the Khwarezmian Shah is unlikely to be correct. Muhammad's assassins were probably sent by the Imam of Alamut whose castle he sacked during the Khurasan expedition.

Some later accounts possibly with the genesis in the writing of Ferishta claimed that his assassins were Hindu Khokhars. In "Tarikh-i-Firishta", he stated that "Twenty Khokhar infidels" who were cowed down by him earlier attacked his carvan and stabbed him with a "dagger". However, this account is not corroborated by the earlier authorities. Minhaj al-Siraj, Hasan Nizami and Shams ad-Dīn adh-Dhahabi all contemporary or near contemporary accounts confirmed that Muhammad was assassinated by a "Heretic devote" ("fida-i-mulahida"). The story of his assassination by the Khokhars is probably an invention of later times based on indirect evidences.

Muhammad of Ghor's coffin was carried from Dhamiak to Ghazna by his Vizier Moidul Mulk along with other elites, where he was buried (Ghazna) in the mausoleum of his daughter.

Succession 
Muhammad of Ghor's only offspring was his daughter who died during his own lifetime. His sudden assassination in Damyak led to a period of struggle among his slaves and other senior Ghurid elites for the succession. The Ghurid aristocrats of Ghazna and Fīrūzkūh supported  the succession of Baha al-Din Sam II from the Bamiyan branch, although his Turkic slaves supported Ghiyath al-Din Mahmud who was his nephew and son of his brother Ghiyath al-Din. Nonethless, Baha al-Din died on his march to Ghazni on 24 February 1206 due to illness.

Thus, Muhammad of Ghor was succeeded by Ghiyath al-Din Mahmud in 1206, although most of his conquests in the Ganga Valley were in the grasp of his slaves: Qutb ud-Din Aibak, Taj al-Din Yildiz, Nasir ad-Din Qabacha and Muhammad Bakhtiyar Khilji who barely consulted Ghiyath al-Din Mahmud in their affairs. Notwithstanding, they still paid him a minimal tribute. During his reign, Mahmud also officially grant "manumission" on Aibak and Yildiz. Thus, freed from the slavery and with investment of a "chatr" from Mahmud, Yildiz established himself as the king of Ghazna in 1206 and Aibak in Lahore (who declared independence in 1208) established the Delhi Sultanate. Historian Iqtidar Alam Khan though, doubted that Aibak styled himself as the "Sultan" as it is not attested by the numismatic evidences. Soon, Mahmud was enforced to accept suzerainty of Alauddin Shah of Khawarazm as attested by the numismatic evidences in which he minted his name along with placing Alauddin's name in the "khuṭbah" until his assassination in 1212.

Afterwards, the Khwarazmians established their puppet government in the Ghurid lands, although Yildiz drove them back in 1213 before Alauddin  eradicated the Ghurids and annexed Fīrūzkūh from Zia al-Din Ali in 1215 who either died as his captive (burned in Iran) or retired to Delhi in exile. Alauddin also defeated and executed the last Ghurid ruler Jalal al-Din Ali from the Bamiyan line in the same year. Thus, the Šansabānī house was extirpated by 1215. Yildiz was toppled from Ghazni around the same time as well who later fled to Delhi and laid his own claim for succession of the Ghurid conquests of Muhammad of Ghor. However, he was defeated and executed in 1216 by Iltutmish in Tarain.

Relations with slaves
According to Minhaj's Tabaqat-i-Nasiri (c.1260), Muhammad of Ghor enthusiastically used to purchase several slaves during his lifetime who later according to Minhaj became renowned for their calibre "throughout the world". Muhammad purchased a young Qabacha who was sold into slavery and was later bestowed with the domains of Kerman and Sanjar for his Iqṭāʿ by the Ghurid Sultan. He raised his slaves with affection and treated them as his sons and successors, after his despondency with his own Ghurid household in his later days. According to another contemporary account of Fakhr-i Mudabbir who wrote under the patronage of Qutb ud-Din Aibak also emphasized upon the importance of each of the Turkish slaves ("bandagan") to Muhammad. He further panegyrise Aibak for enduring the trust of his master. Muhammad's slaves played a key role in the expansion and consolidation of the Ghurid conquests in the Ganga-Jamuna doab when he was engaged in the affairs of Khurasan and amidst this also raised their own authority in the North India while still regarding Muhammad of Ghor as their supreme master until his assassination.

Muhammad of Ghor, later also organized matrimonial alliances among the families of his slaves in accordance with the practise of endogamy. The notable among these alliances, were the marriages of the daughters of Taj al-Din Yildiz to Qutb ud-Din Aibak and Nasir ad-Din Qabacha. Further, two daughters of Aibak were married to Qabacha. This policy was continued by Aibak as well, who married his daughter to his slave Illtutmish.

In popular traditions, when a courtier lamented that the Sultan (Muhammad of Ghor) had no male heirs, he retorted:

Legacy 

During his joint reign with brother Ghiyath al-Din Ghori, the Ghurids emerged as one of the greatest power of the eastern Islamic world. The Ghurids reached pinnacle of their territorial expansion where they briefly ruled over a territory which spanned over 3000 km from east to west. Muhammad of Ghor's empire stretched from Nishapur (although for a short span) in eastern Iran to Benares and Bengal in present-day India and from the foothills of the Himalaya south to Sindh (Pakistan).

The Catastrophe of Andkhud and the collapse of the Šansabānī dynasty within a decade of his assassination along with the rise of Changez Khan who carved out the largest contiguous empire in history made his short-lived successes in the Khurasan and Persia as less consequential in contrast to the more substantial Islamic monarchs of Central Asia. While, Muhammad was not much successful against his Turkish adversaries in the Transoxiana, notwithstanding, his success in the Indian Subcontinent had far flug consequences. The 13th century chronicle Jawami ul-Hikayat, by Muhammad Aufi, mentioned that the Sultan (Muhammad of Ghor) "khuṭbah was read in all the mosques from Herat to Assam".  His decisive victory in the Second Battle of Tarain against the Rajput forces of Prithviraja III opened the whole of Ganges Basin to the Turkic occupation and subsequently laid to the establishment of the Delhi Sultanate by Qutb ud-Din Aibak which was further consolidated by his slave commander Illtutmish. In the ensuring times, the Sultanate of Delhi turned to be the only major Islamic state that survived amongst the carnage in the Central Asia caused by the Mongols during the thirteenth century.

The Ghurids similar to the Ghaznavids were unpopular among their subjects of the Khurasan. According to Minhaj al-Siraj, Muhammad imposed heavy taxes, plundered and seized the property in Tus for the expanses of his army, which was committed for the protection of a Imam's shrine. These events eventually turned the people belligerent towards the Ghurids who retaliated when Muhammad of Ghor besieged Gurganz and militarily supported the besieged Khwarezmian Shah who as a result collected a hughe army of 70,000 which eventually forced Muhammad to relieve the siege and retreat before being cornered by the Qara Khitai forces.

The Ghor region, however, during his reign did prospered and became a leading centre of learning and culture. He also gave grants to various theologians like Maulana Fakharudin Razi who preached the Islamic teachings in the backward regions of the Ghurid empire. Muhammad also briefly contributed in the archietectural aspect of his region, chiefly constructing distinctive kind of Islamic glazed tiles in his capital Ghazna.

Memorials

 A shrine for Muhammad Ghori was built in Dhamiak by Pakistani scientist Abdul Qadeer Khan in 1994-1995 and was later handed over to the Punjab archaeology department. Following his assassination in Dhamiak, the corpse of Muhammad Ghori was actually placed in the mausoleum of his daughter in Ghazni.
 Pakistani military named three of its medium-range ballistic missile Ghauri-I, Ghauri-II and Ghauri-III, in the memory of Mu'izz.

Coins

During his reign from Ghazna until 1203, Muhmmad of Ghor minted his name jointly with the name of his brother Ghiyath al-Din Muhammad in his coinage. The Ghurid circulation of coins from Khurasan, as well as the area that comprises present-day Afghanistan and Central Asia during his reign featured the traditional Islamic coins without any images and with his name written in the Arabic and Persian script. However, the circulation of coins from Northern India during his reign were considerably different to those issued in Central Asia.

Muhammad of Ghor continued the circulation of coins on the same model as of his adversaries in the northwestern India whom he defeated. In Delhi, the Ghurid circulation continued with the existing pattern of the coins which had the image of Nandi Bull and a "Chahaman horsemen" along with his name written as "Shri Hammirah". The gold mint issued by him in North India had the image of Hindu deity Lakshmi (based on the existing pattern of Chahamanas) on one side and Muhammad Ghori's name in the Nāgarī script on other side written in Sanskrit.

Historian Sunil Kumar theorizes on the basis of hoard evidences that the coins issued by Muhammad of Ghor were accepted on the same scale by the local Indian financiers and bankers as the previous coins which were issued by the Rajputs, despite a period of transition (regime change) in the political milieu of northern India. Andre Wink further noted that this pattern of circulation based on the existing coinage continued apparently till the early reign of Iltutmish, who although later made reforms in the coinage system of the Delhi Sultanate.

Notes

References

Bibliography

External links

Islamic rule in the Indian subcontinent
1206 deaths
12th-century Iranian people
13th-century Iranian people
Ghurid dynasty
Muslim monarchs
Murdered Persian monarchs
Assassinated Iranian people
13th-century murdered monarchs